In mathematics, a mutation, also called a homotope, of a unital Jordan algebra is a new Jordan algebra defined by a given element of the Jordan algebra. The mutation has a unit if and only if the given element is invertible, in which case the mutation is called a proper mutation or an isotope. Mutations were first introduced by Max Koecher in his Jordan algebraic approach to Hermitian symmetric spaces and bounded symmetric domains of tube type. Their functorial properties allow an explicit construction of the corresponding Hermitian symmetric space of compact type as a compactification of a finite-dimensional complex semisimple Jordan algebra. The automorphism group of the compactification becomes a complex subgroup, the complexification of its maximal compact subgroup. Both groups act transitively on the compactification. The theory has been extended to cover all Hermitian symmetric spaces using the theory of Jordan pairs or Jordan triple systems. Koecher obtained the results in the more general case directly from the Jordan algebra case using the fact that only Jordan pairs associated with period two automorphisms of Jordan algebras are required.

Definitions

Let A be a unital Jordan algebra over a field k of characteristic ≠ 2. For a in A define the Jordan multiplication operator on A by

and the quadratic representation Q(a) by

It satisfies

the  fundamental identity

the commutation or homotopy identity

where

In particular if a or b is invertible then

It follows that A with the operations Q and R and the identity element defines a quadratic Jordan algebra, where a quadratic Jordan algebra consists of a vector space A  with a distinguished element 1  and a quadratic map of A into endomorphisms of A, a ↦ Q(a), satisfying the conditions:

 
  ("fundamental identity")
  ("commutation or homotopy identity"), where 

The Jordan triple product is defined by

so that

There are also the formulas

For y in A the mutation Ay is defined to the vector space A with multiplication

 
If Q(y) is invertible, the mutual is called a proper mutation or isotope.

Quadratic Jordan algebras

Let A be a quadratic Jordan algebra over a field k of characteristic ≠ 2. Following , a linear Jordan algebra structure can be associated with A such that, if L(a) is Jordan multiplication, then the quadratic structure is given by Q(a) = 2L(a)2 − L(a2).

Firstly the axiom Q(a)R(b,a) = R(a,b)Q(a) can be strengthened to

Indeed, applied to c, the first two terms give

Switching b and c then gives

Now let

 
Replacing b by a and a by 1 in the identity above gives

In particular

The Jordan product is given by

so that

The formula above shows that 1 is an identity. Defining a2 by a∘a = Q(a)1, the only remaining condition to be verified is the Jordan identity

In the fundamental identity

Replace a by a + t1, set b = 1 and compare the coefficients of t2 on both sides:

Setting b = 1 in the second axiom gives

and therefore L(a) must commute with L(a2).

Inverses
Let A be a unital Jordan algebra over a field k of characteristic ≠ 2. An element a in a unital Jordan algebra A is said to be invertible if there is an element b such that ab = 1 and a2b = a.

Properties.

This gives

Hence . Applying  gives . Hence . Since  commutes with  it commutes with its inverse .

Indeed, if  is invertible then the above implies  is invertible with inverse . Any inverse b satisfies , so .  Conversely if  is invertible let . Then
.

This follows from the formula .

Suppose that . Then by the fundamental identity  is invertible, so  is invertible.

If  and  commute, then  implies . Conversely suppose that  is invertible with inverse . Then . So it commutes with 
.

Conversely  leaves  invariant. So if it is bijective on  it is bijective there.

Elementary properties of proper mutations

In fact 
multiplication in the algebra Ay is given by

so by definition is commutative. It follows that

with

If e satisfies , then taking a = 1 gives

Taking a = e gives

so that L(y) and L(e) commute. Hence y is invertible and e = y−1.

Now for y invertible set

Then

Moreover,

Finally

since

Hence

Thus  is a unital quadratic Jordan algebra. It therefore corresponds to a linear Jordan algebra with the associated Jordan multiplication operator M(a)  given by

This shows that the operators  satisfy the Jordan identity so that the proper mutation or isotope  is a unital Jordan algebra.

Nonunital mutations
The definition of mutation also applies to non-invertible elements y. If A is finite-dimensional over R or C, invertible elements a in A are dense, since invertibility is equivalent to the condition that det Q(a) ≠ 0. So by continuity the Jordan identity for proper mutations implies the Jordan identity for arbitrary mutations. In general the  Jordan identity can be deduced from Macdonald's theorem for Jordan algebras because it involves only two elements of the Jordan algebra. Alternatively, the Jordan identity can be deduced by realizing the mutation inside a unital quadratic algebra.

For a in A define a quadratic structure on A1 = A ⊕ k by

It can then be verified that  is a unital quadratic Jordan algebra.  The unital Jordan algebra to which it corresponds has Ay as an ideal, so that in particular Ay satisfies the Jordan identity. The identities for a unital quadratic Jordan algebra follow from the following compatibility properties of the quadratic map  and the squaring map 
:

 
 
 
 
 
 .

Hua's identity
Let A be a unital Jordan algebra. If a, b and a – b are invertible, then Hua's identity holds:

In particular if x and 1 – x are invertible, then so too is 1 – x−1 with

To prove the identity for x, set . Then .

It follows that . Moreover,  since . Thus  has inverse .

Now let  be the mutation of A defined by a.

So by the special case of Hua's identity for x in

Bergman operator
If A is a unital Jordan algebra, the Bergman operator is defined for a, b in A by

If a is invertible then

while if b is invertible then

In fact if a is invertible

and similarly if b is invertible.

More generally the Bergman operator satisfies a version of the commutation or homotopy identity:

and a version of the fundamental identity:

There is also a third more technical identity:

Quasi-invertibility
Let A be a finite-dimensional unital Jordan algebra over a field k of characteristic ≠ 2.

 
In this case the Bergman operator  defines an invertible operator on A and

In fact

Moreover, by definition  is invertible if and only if   is invertible. In that case

Indeed,

The assumption that  be invertible can be dropped since  can be defined only supposing that the Bergman operator  is invertible. The pair  is then said to be quasi-invertible. In that case  is defined by the formula

The fundamental identity implies that . So by finite-dimensionality  is invertible. Thus  is invertible if and only if 
 is invertible and in this case

In fact

so the formula follows by applying  to both sides.
 
As before  is quasi-invertible if and only if  is quasi-invertible; and in that case

In general the proof requires four identities for the Bergman operator:

In fact applying  to the identity  yields

The second identity follows by similar cancellation in

.

The third identity follows by applying the second identity to an element d and then switching the roles of c and d. The fourth follows because

.

In fact  is quasi-invertible if and only if  is quasi-invertible in the mutation . This condition can be expressed as follows without mentioning the mutation or homotope:

In fact if  is quasi-invertible, then  satisfies the first identity by definition. The second follows because . On the other hand, 
Hence  is invertible.

Equivalence relation
Let A be a finite-dimensional unital Jordan algebra over a field k of characteristic ≠ 2.

This is an equivalence relation, since if  is invertible  so that a pair  is equivalent to itself. It is symmetric since from the definition . It is transitive. From the above

is invertible and

When k = R or C, the fact that this more general definition also gives an equivalence relation can deduced from the invertible case by continuity. For general k, it can also be verified directly:

The relation is symmetric, since .
The relation is transitive. In this case

so that  is quasi-invertible with

Structure groups

Let  be a finite-dimensional complex semisimple unital Jordan algebra. Thus
The structure group of A consists of g in  such that

They form a group . The automorphism group Aut A of A  consists of invertible complex linear operators  g such that L(ga) = gL(a)g−1 and g1 = 1. Since an automorphism g preserves the trace form, g−1 = gt.

The structure group is closed under taking transposes g ↦ gt and adjoints  g ↦ g*.
The structure group contains the automorphism group. The automorphism group can be identified with the stabilizer of 1 in the structure group.
If a is invertible, Q(a) lies in the structure group.
If g is in the structure group and a is invertible, ga is also invertible with (ga)−1 = (gt)−1a−1.
 The structure group Γ(A)  acts transitively on the set of invertible elements in A.
 Every g in Γ(A) has the form g = h Q(a) with h an automorphism and a invertible.

The complex Jordan algebra A is the complexification of a real Euclidean Jordan algebra E, for which the trace form defines an inner product. The unitary structure group Γu(A) is the subgroup of Γ(A) consisting of unitary operators, so that .

 The stabilizer of 1 in Γu(A) is Aut E.
 Every g in  Γu(A) has the form g = h Q(u) with h in Aut E and u invertible in A with u* = u−1.
 Γ(A) is the complexification of Γu(A).
 The set S of invertible elements u in A such that  u* = u−1 can be characterized equivalently either as those u for which L(u) is a normal operator with uu* = 1 or as those u of the form  exp ia for some a in E. In particular S is connected.
 The identity component of Γu(A) acts transitively on S
 Given a Jordan frame (ei) and v in A, there is an operator u in the identity component of Γu(A) such that uv = Σ αi ei with αi ≥ 0. If v is invertible, then αi > 0.

The structure group Γ(A) acts naturally on X. For g in Γ(A), set

Then  is quasi-invertible if and only if  is quasi-invertible and

In fact the covariance relations for g with Q and the inverse imply that

if x is invertible and so everywhere by density. In turn this implies the relation for the quasi-inverse. If a is invertible then Q(a) lies in Γ(A) and if (a,b) is quasi-invertible B(a,b) lies in Γ(A). So both types of operators act on X.

Since , the corresponding complex Lie algebra contains the operators . The operators  span  and
satisfy  and
.

Geometric properties of quotient space
Let A be a finite-dimensional complex unital Jordan algebra which is semisimple, i.e. the trace form Tr L(ab) is non-degenerate. Let  be the subset of X of classes . The map ,  is injective.

 

The transition maps of the atlas with charts  are given by

and are injective and holomorphic since

with derivative

 
Indeed, all the polynomial functions  are non-trivial since .

 uses the Bergman operators to construct an explicit biholomorphism between X and a closed smooth algebraic subvariety of complex projective space. This implies in particular that  is compact. There is a more direct proof of compactness using symmetry groups.

Given a Jordan frame (ei) in E, for every a in A there is a k in U = Γu(A) such that 
Because   is a direct sum of copies of C, Z is just a product of Riemann spheres, one for each . In particular it is compact. There is a natural map of Z into X which is continuous. Let Y be the image of Z. It is compact and therefore coincides with the closure of Y0 = Ae ⊂ A = X0. The set U⋅Y is the continuous image of the compact set U × Y. It is therefore compact. On the other hand, U⋅Y0 = X0, so it contains a dense subset of X and must therefore coincide with X. So X is compact.

. The mapping of Z into X is in fact an embedding.

Möbius transformations
Let  be a finite-dimensional complex semisimple unital Jordan algebra. The group SL(2,C) acts by Möbius transformation on the Riemann sphere C ∪ {∞}, the one-point compactification of C. If g in SL(2,C) is given by the matrix

then

There is a generalization of this action of SL(2,C) to A and its compactification X. In order to define this action, note that SL(2,C) is generated by the three subgroups of lower and upper unitriangular matrices and the diagonal matrices. It is also generated by the lower (or upper) unitriangular matrices, the diagonal matrices and the matrix

The matrix J corresponds to the Möbius transformation  and can be written

The Möbius transformations fixing ∞ are just the upper triangular matrices. If g does not fix ∞, it sends ∞ to a finite point a. But then g can be composed with an upper unitriangular to send a to 0 and then with J to send 0 to infinity.

The action is thus defined everywhere on  if g is upper triangular. On the other hand, the action on X is simple to define for lower triangular matrices.

For lower unitriangular matrices, with off-diagonal parameter γ, define .

if  is invertible, so this is an extension of the Möbius action.
A simpler method is to note that the operator  can be implemented directly using its intertwining relations with the unitary structure group.

In fact on the invertible elements in A, the operator  satisfies .

In particular  for some λ ≠ 0. Let .

The holomorphic transformations corresponding to upper unitriangular matrices can be defined using the fact that they are the conjugates by J of lower unitriangular matrices, for which the action is already known.

Holomorphic symmetry group
Let  be a finite-dimensional complex semisimple unital Jordan algebra. It is the complexification of a compact Lie group without center, so a semisimple algebraic group.

The group G is generated by three types of holomorphic transformation on :

These were already described above.

The operators  normalize the group of operators . Similarly the operator  normalizes the structure group, . This group is normalized by the operators W of the structure group.

Indeed, .

Let  and  be the complex Abelian groups formed by the symmetries  and  respectively. Let .

For  invertible, Hua's identity can be rewritten

Moreover,  and
.

The convariance relations show that the elements of  fall into sets
The first expression for  follows once it is established that no new elements appear in the fourth or subsequent sets. For this it suffices to show that

.

Then

It suffices to check that if , then . If so , so .

Exchange relations

For  invertible, Hua's identity can be rewritten

For quasi-invertible pairs , there are the "exchange relations"

Taking inverses, it is equivalent to the identity .

It then reduces to the identity:

In fact, if  is quasi-invertible, then  is quasi-invertible if and only if  is quasi-invertible. This follows because  is quasi-invertible if and only if  is. Moreover, the above formula holds in this case.

For the proof, two more identities are required:

The first follows from a previous identity by applying the transpose. For the second, because of the transpose, it suffices to prove the first equality. Setting  in the identity  yields

so the identity follows by cancelling .

To prove the formula, the relations 
and  show that it is enough to prove that

Indeed, . On the other hand, 
So .

Now set .

Clearly .

Lie algebra of holomorphic vector fields

The compact complex manifold  is modelled on the space . The derivatives of the transition maps describe the tangent bundle through holomorphic transition functions . The corresponding holomorphic vector bundle with fibre  is the tangent bundle of the complex manifold . Its holomorphic sections are just holomorphic vector fields on X. They can be determined directly using the fact that they must be invariant under the natural adjoint action of the known holomorphic symmetries of X. They form a finite-dimensional complex semisimple Lie algebra. The restriction of these vector fields to X0 can be described explicitly.

The structure group  has Lie algebra  spanned by the operators .

Let

This gives the structure of a 3-graded Lie algebra.

The group  of Möbius transformations of X normalizes the Lie algebra . The transformation  corresponding to the Weyl group element  induces the involutive automorphism  given by

More generally the action of a Möbius transformation

can be described explicitly. In terms of generators diagonal matrices act as

upper unitriangular matrices act as

and lower unitriangular matrices act as

This can be written uniformly in matrix notation as

The Killing form is given by

where  is the symmetric bilinear form defined by

with the bilinear form  corresponding to the trace form: .

 
 
 

The nondegeneracy of the Killing form is immediate from the explicit formula. By Cartan's criterion,  is semisimple. In the next section the group  is realized as the complexification of a connected compact Lie group  with trivial center, so semisimple. This gives a direct means to verify semisimplicity. The group H also acts transitively on X.

The restriction of such a vector field to  gives a holomorphic map of A into A. The power series expansion around 0 is a convergent sum of homogeneous parts of degree . By taking Fourier coefficients with respect to T, the part of degree m is also a holomorphic vector field. Degree 0 is accounted for by the constant fields. Since conjugation by  interchanges degree 0 and degree 2, it follows that  account for all these holomorphic vector fields. Conjugation by J would give another such map N. Moreover, . But then

Then

So   is exactly the space of holomorphic vector fields on X.

Compact real form

Then  must leave the subalgebra  invariant. Hence so must . This forces , so that  . If  acts trivially, .

The group  can thus be identified with its image in GL .

Let  be the complexification of a Euclidean Jordan algebra . For , set . It is a closed subgroup of U(A).

This is a period 2 conjugate-linear automorphism of the Lie algebra.

In particular this gives a homomorphism of  into .

Now every matrix  in  can be written as a product

On the other hand, so that
. Hence . In particular H is compact and connected since both K and S are. Because it is a closed subgroup of U , it is a Lie group. Thus it contains .

In particular  has trivial center. Since   is invariant under  so is its orthogonal complement. (This also follows from a dimension count since .)

 is a closed subgroup of  GL   so a real Lie group. Since the Lie algebra of  normalizes  and o is the only element centralizing , as in the compact case the Lie algebra of  must be . (This can also be seen by a dimension count since .) Since it is a complex subspace,  is a complex Lie group. It is connected because it is the continuous image of the connected set .

Noncompact real form
Let τ be the conjugate-linear period 2 automorphism of  defined by

Let  be the fixed point algebra of τ. The stabilizer of

The noncompact real semisimple Lie group  acts on X with an open orbit . This orbit structure can be explicitly described when the Jordan algebra  is simple. Let  be the subset of   consisting of elements  with exactly  of the αi less than one and exactly  of them greater than one. Thus . There is a unique compact orbit .
In particular  is in the closure of every orbit.

Jordan algebras with involution
The preceding theory describes irreducible Hermitian symmetric spaces of tube type in terms of unital Jordan algebras. In  general Hermitian symmetric spaces are described  by a systematic extension of the above theory to Jordan pairs.

Let τ be a period two automorphism of a simple Euclidean Jordan algebra E with complexification A.  There are corresponding decompositions E = E+ ⊕ E− and A = A+ ⊕ A− into ±1 eigenspaces of τ. Let . τ is assumed to satisfy the additional condition that the trace form on  defines an inner product.

The conditions for quasi-invertibility in  show that  is invertible if and only if  is invertible. A space of equivalence classes  can be defined on pairs .
.

Restricted to  the components are generated as before by the constant functions into , by the operators  and by the operators . The Lie brackets are given by exactly the same formula as before.

The operators  and 
 commute, so  leaves the eigenspaces above invariant. 
This induces a Pierce decomposition . The subspace  becomes a Euclidean Jordan algebra with unit  under the mutation Jordan product }.

They form an orthogonal family by construction.

The tripotents are necessarily minimal. Any two frames are related by an element in the subgroup of the structure group of  preserving the trace form. Thus  becomes a complex normed space with open unit ball .

Since , it follows that |||| = ||||n.

For a Jordan frame , let .

It is a compact connected Lie group. Thus , a Hermitian symmetric space of compact type.

Let  be the identity component of the closed subgroup of  carrying  onto itself. Let ρ be the conjugate-linear period 2 automorphism of  defined by

Let  be the fixed point algebra of ρ. The stabilizer of

The Hermitian symmetric space of non-compact type have an unbounded realization, analogous the upper half-plane in C. Möbius transformations in  corresponding to the Cayley transform and its inverse give biholomorphisms of the Riemann sphere exchanging the unit disk and the  upper halfplane.

It takes the disk  in  onto a Siegel domain of the second kind.

In this case  is a Euclidean Jordan algebra and there is symmetric -valued bilinear form on  such that the corresponding quadratic form  takes values in its positive cone .
.

Examples
For simple Euclidean Jordan algebras  with complexication , the Hermitian symmetric spaces of compact type  can be described explicitly as follows, using Cartan's classification.

Type In. A is the Jordan algebra of n × n complex matrices  with the operator Jordan product . The subset  corresponds to the matrices  with  invertible. This is a module for  acting on the target space. There is also an action of  induced by the action on the source space. The space of injective maps  is invariant and  acts freely on it. Define a map of  into  by sending  to the injective map (|). This map induces an isomorphism of  onto .

, it is the graph of an invertible operator .

At the other extreme, 
The subspace  corresponds to the pair (|), where  is the orthogonal projection of  onto .

Similarly the orthogonal complement  of  can be written . 
The direct  sum  is of the second kind and its orthogonal complement of the first.

The corresponding map on  sends (|) to
(|). Similarly the map corresponding to  sends (|) to
(|), the map corresponding to  sends (|) to
(|) and the map corresponding to  sends
(|) to (|). It follows that the map corresponding to  sends 
(|) to
(|).
On the other hand, if  is invertible,
(|) is equivalent to
(|), whence the formula for the fractional linear transformation.

Type IIIn. A is the Jordan algebra of n × n symmetric complex matrices  with the operator Jordan product . In matrix notation if ,

Let  denote the complex symplectic group, the subgroup of  preserving ω.  It consists of  such that  and is closed under . If  belongs to  then

It has center }. The subset  corresponds to the matrices  with  invertible. This is a module for  acting on the target space. There is also an action of  induced by the action on the source space. The space of injective maps  with isotropic image, i.e. ω vanishes on the image, is invariant. Moreover,  acts freely on it. Define a map of  into  by sending  to the injective map (|). This map induces an isomorphism of  onto .

Let  be a Lagrangian subspace complementing .

At the other extreme, 
The subspace  corresponds to the pair (|), where  is the projection of  onto . In particular V1 is identified with U2 and V2 with U1. Moreover, they are V1 and U1 are orthogonal with respect to the symmetric bilinear form on (. Hence the idempotent  satisfies .

Similarly  can be written . 
The direct sum  is of the second kind. It has a complement of the first kind.

The corresponding map on  sends (|) to
(|). Similarly the map corresponding to  sends (|) to
(|), the map corresponding to  sends (|) to
(|) and the map corresponding to  sends
(|) to (|). It follows that the map corresponding to  sends 
(|) to
(|).
On the other hand, if  is invertible,
(|) is equivalent to
(|), whence the formula for the fractional linear transformation.

Type II2n.

Type IVn. A is the Jordan algebra  with Jordan product . It is the complexication of the rank 2 Euclidean Jordan algebra defined by the same formulas but with real coefficients.

Type VI. The complexified Albert algebra.

The Hermitian symmetric spaces of compact type  for simple Euclidean Jordan algebras  with period two automorphism can be described explicitly as follows, using Cartan's classification.

Type Ip,q. Let F be the space of q by p matrices over R with p ≠ q. This corresponds to the automorphism of E = Hp + q(R) given by conjugating by the diagonal matrix with p diagonal entries equal to 1 and q to −1. The structure is given by
the triple product . So a similar representation holds for mappings, but now with  q by p matrices.

Type IIn F is the space of real skew-symmetric m by m matrices.

Type V. F is the direct sum of two copies of the Cayley numbers, regarded as 1 by 2 matrices. This corresponds to the canonical period 2 automorphism defined by any minimal idempotent in E = H3(O).

See also
 Mutation (algebra)
 Symmetric cone

Notes

References

 

 

Non-associative algebras
Lie groups
Complex manifolds